The Maria Clara Lorenzo Lobregat Highway (commonly known as MCLL Highway) is a two-to -four lane national highway running in the east coast part of Zamboanga City, Philippines from the city's boundary with Tungawan, Zamboanga Sibugay in Barangay Licomo to the intersection with Governor Camins Road and Veterans Avenue at the Sta. Cruz Intersection. Under Republic Act No. 9270 approved on March 19, 2004, the highway was named after the Maria Clara Lobregat, who was the city's first female mayor serving from 1998 until her death in January 2004.

The highway is also part of the Pan-Philippine Highway, particularly its section also known as Lanao-Pagadian-Zamboanga City Road and Pagadian City-Zamboanga City Road, and a designated component of National Route 1 (N1) the Philippine highway network.

Incidents
There were no reports of accidents or injuries, but hundreds of commuters were stranded in Zamboanga City because provincial buses could not pass through.

References

Roads in Zamboanga del Sur
Roads in Zamboanga Sibugay